The Coinage Offences Act 1832 (2 & 3 Will. 4 c. 34) was an Act of the Parliament of the United Kingdom of Great Britain and Ireland. It consolidated into one Act all offences concerning the counterfeiting and clipping of coins. Such conduct was often considered to be high treason: this Act downgraded the offence to felony and abolished the death penalty for all coinage offences.

See also
High treason in the United Kingdom
Capital punishment in the United Kingdom
Treason Act 1351
Treason Act 1415 (also Coin Acts 1572 and 1575)
Coin Act 1732
Treason Act
Peel's Acts
Coinage Offences Act
Forgery, Abolition of Punishment of Death Act 1832

References

United Kingdom Acts of Parliament 1832
1832 in England
Treason in the United Kingdom
Repealed United Kingdom Acts of Parliament
Currency law in the United Kingdom